Domingos Montagner Filho (26 February 1962 – 15 September 2016) was a Brazilian actor, playwright and entrepreneur. He began his career in theaters and circuses, through the course of interpretation of Myriam Muniz. In 1997, Montagner formed La Mínima group, alongside Fernando Sampaio, and won the Shell Award for Best Actor. In 2003, he founded the Zanni Circus, of which he was artistic director.

He began his career on TV, three years later, but gained national notoriety after portraying Captain Herculano in the soap opera Cordel Encantado (2011), Mundo in Joia Rara (2013), and Miguel in Sete Vidas (2015). In cinema, he participated in the feature film Gonzaga: de Pai pra Filho (2012). He became "one of Brazil's most loved TV actors."

In 2016, Montagner portrayed Santo dos Anjos, the protagonist of the soap opera Velho Chico, broadcast by Rede Globo, his last work. In a break between filming, he drowned while swimming in the São Francisco River, the main setting of the aforementioned television drama.

Biography and career

Montagner was born in São Paulo's neighborhood of Tatuapé in a family of Italian Brazilians. He began working at sixteen in the bar of his parents in Tatuapé, where he worked as an office boy and archivist in an engineering company. Slender, at 6 ft 3 in (1.90 m) tall, he became an athlete of the Sport Club Corinthians Paulista playing handball.

Montagner was a second lieutenant in the Brazilian Army and after leaving military service graduated in physical education, teaching in the 1980s in public and private schools in São Paulo. It was nearly eleven years later when he began his artistic career at 27.

He was a Roman Catholic.

His artistic career began in the circus, in his theater company La Mínima in 1980. In 1990, Montagner joined the theater as a clown.

Montagner became a star of Brazilian television despite the fact that his first major television role did not come until he was 46. His first television series was Cordel Encantado of Rede Globo. He made a few appearances on the television shows Força-Tarefa and A Cura. He also participated in the show Divã,  portraying Carlos Alencar, the lover of the protagonist Mercedes, played by actress Lília Cabral. In 2012, he played the role of President Paulo Ventura in the miniseries O Brado Retumbante. In the same year, he played in Salve Jorge the Turkish tour guide Zyah, who falls in love with Bianca, Cléo Pires' character. In 2013, he played the role of the activist Mundo in Joia Rara.

In 2015, he was cast as the protagonist of Sete Vidas, in the role of Miguel, a man who discovers that he has seven children, after being a sperm donor.
His last performance was in 2016 in the soap opera Velho Chico, interpreting the character Santo dos Anjos.

Personal life

Married since 2002 to Luciana Lima, administrative producer of La Mínima group, Montagner claimed that his wife would encourage him the most.

Death

On 15 September 2016, during the lunch break of the filming for Velho Chico, Montagner jumped into the São Francisco River, in the city of Canindé de São Francisco, state of Sergipe, but did not return to the mainland. Actress Camila Pitanga was swimming with Montagner and saw him disappearing into the water, dragged by a strong current. She screamed for help, being initially mistaken as if she was filming a scene. After realizing that the actress was screaming out of panic, the crew immediately stood up to check what was happening, as a boat came to rescue her. Montagner went missing for four hours until his body was found submerged and lifeless. According to reports the Legal Medical Institute (IML) of Sergipe, the result of the autopsy performed Montagner's body pointed out that the actor died of mechanical asphyxia by drowning.

The Brazilian version of online magazine The Intercept speculated that the strong currents where the actor drowned were caused by the hydroelectric dam, the Xingó Dam, upstream. The dam lies approximately two kilometers upstream, and the flow rate allowed through the dam can affect currents.

At the time of his death, the filming of Velho Chico was just a few days from completion. However, climactic scenes for the finale, in which Montagner was the main character, hadn't been filmed yet. Production decided to complete the job as scheduled. Scenes in which Montagner's character, Santo, would have appeared would be shot from the character's point of view. Thus, Santo would be present in the scene, but would not be seen.

Weeks prior to the casualty, Rede Globo aired a scene where Santo would be saved by Indians, who found him unconscious floating on the São Francisco River, having been shot by his enemy. The river was the same where the actor lost his life.

Filmography

Films

Television

Theatre

Awards and nominations

References

External links

1962 births
2016 deaths
Male actors from São Paulo
Brazilian male actors
Brazilian people of Italian descent
Brazilian Roman Catholics
Brazilian male television actors
Deaths by drowning